Fayette County is a county located in the north central portion of the U.S. state of Georgia. As of the 2020 census, the population was 119,194, an increase from 106,567 in 2010. Fayette County was established in 1821. The county seat, Fayetteville, was established in 1823. Much of Fayette County is bordered on the east side by the Flint River.

Fayette County was organized in 1821 after the United States signed a treaty at Indian Springs, Georgia with the Creek people for cession of a large portion of their land. The county and its seat, Fayetteville, were both named in honor of the French aristocrat the Marquis de Lafayette, who aided General George Washington in the American Revolutionary War.

Since the late 20th century, Fayette County has been part of the Greater Atlanta Metropolitan Area. It is located south of Atlanta, which is based in Fulton County. Fayette County is minutes from Hartsfield-Jackson International Airport. As a suburb of Atlanta, Fayette County has increased rapidly in population and development since the late 20th century, nearly doubling its population since 1990.

History 

Fayette County was created on May 15, 1821, from territory ceded to the United States by the Creek people, who had historically inhabited the area. It was named for the Marquis de Lafayette, French hero of the American Revolutionary War.

In the years following World War II, the county developed suburban residential communities, with many workers commuting to Atlanta. Peachtree City was chartered in 1959. It was developed as the only planned community in the county and in the Southeast; it covers 16,000 acres.

The county population has increased rapidly during the late twentieth century with the growth of Atlanta. It has also benefited from a reverse migration of African Americans to the South, as new residents are attracted to jobs and opportunities. Significant growth and development continues.

In 2002 Charles "Chuck" Floyd was appointed to the position of Chief Magistrate Judge of the county. In 2004 and 2008, he was elected to the position in his own right, the first African American ever elected to any office in the county.

Government

Fayette County's local government is led by a board of five county commissioners, known as the governing authority of Fayette County. Since March 2016, four seats are to be filled by election from single-member districts and one at-large from the county.

Voting rights suit and settlement
Until 2013, the county was divided into three "county commission districts." Three of the members of the board of commissioners were required to live inside one of the designated districts. The remaining two commissioners could live anywhere in the county. All members of the county commission were elected "at-large," which meant that each candidate had to attract the majority of votes across the county in order to win. Since 1982, more than 100 cases of such at-large voting systems in Georgia have been replaced by single-member districts.

The five members of the school board were also elected at-large. In the early 21st century, Fayette County was one of only 20 school boards among 180 in the state of Georgia to maintain at-large voting to elect members of these boards. The practical effect was the exclusion of African Americans from these positions. The county has been majority-white and majority-Republican since the late 20th century. Neither Republican nor Democratic African-American candidates had any electoral success.

In 2011 the NAACP and several African-American county residents filed suit against the county and the board for the at-large voting system. In May 2013, the federal district court ordered the county and school board to change their systems of at-large voting, finding that it violated the Voting Rights Act of 1965 by diluting the voting power of the minority. African Americans make up 20% of the county population but were unable to elect candidates of their choice, as every commission and school board seat required a majority of county voters. The county has a majority-white, majority-Republican population.

Under the federal ruling, five districts were established so that members of both the school board and county commission are elected from single-member districts. This broadened representation on the boards. Voters of each district elect a commissioner living within its boundaries.

In 2014, Democrat Pota E. Coston was elected as the first black county commissioner in the 194-year history of the county. Leonard Presberg was first appointed and then elected in his own right as the first Jewish member of the school board.

The county and school board both appealed the federal district court ruling. In January 2015, the US Court of Appeals for the 11th Circuit in Atlanta remanded the case to the district court for a bench trial by the federal district judge, ruling that Judge Timothy Batten Sr. had made a technical error in granting summary judgment in the case. It did not overturn his ruling to establish the single-member district system. The bench trial by Judge Batten would give the county an opportunity to present additional evidence to support its case.

After Coston died in office, the Fayette Board of Elections voted to use at-large voting in a special election to replace her. The NAACP returned to court as it opposed using the former system. Judge Batten ruled that the county had to use the single-member district system established by his earlier ruling. In September 2015 Democrat Charles Rousseau was elected from District 5 to succeed Coston, becoming the second African American elected to the county commission. In October 2015 the Fayette Chamber of Commerce and two prominent white leaders urged the county to settle the nearly five-year lawsuit and accept district voting. Judge Batten ordered the two sides into mediation and postponed the bench trial. In January 2016 the Fayette County School Board voted unanimously to settle the lawsuit and accept district voting for election of its members. The County Commission voted to settle by a 3–2 vote.

Together with the NAACP and black county plaintiffs, the county commission agreed in January 2016 to a system of electing four members from single-member districts and the fifth as an at-large member. A law implementing this change was signed by Governor Nathan Deal in March 2016.

Representation
Fayette County has five incorporated municipalities within its borders; Fayetteville, Brooks, Woolsey, Tyrone and Peachtree City. Formerly, Inman was also a municipality, but gave up its charter years ago. In 2015, Fayetteville, a majority-white city, elected its first African-American mayor, Ed Johnson. In 2011, he had been the first African American elected to its city council and only the second African American elected to any office in the history of Fayette County.
Fayette is represented in the U.S. House by the 3rd and 13th congressional districts, and in the General Assembly by the 16th and 34th state senate and 63rd, 64th, 71st, 72nd and 73rd state house districts.

Politics
Fayette County has been a Republican stronghold since 1980.  In 1980 and 1984, it was the most Republican county in the entire state. However, with the rapid population growth much of the Atlanta metro has experienced in recent years, the percentage of Republican voters has decreased significantly in each of the past three elections. The margin went from Mitt Romney's 31.2 points in 2012, to Donald Trump's 19.1 points in 2016, to 6.8 points in his 2020 reelection bid. In the runoff for the 2022  United States Senate election in Georgia, Raphael Warnock narrowly lost the county in his re-election bid by a margin of 491 votes or 1.0 points.

Geography

The Flint River passes through the county and provided the earliest route for transportation and shipping of commodity crops. The entirety of Fayette County is located in the Upper Flint River sub-basin of the ACF River Basin (Apalachicola-Chattahoochee-Flint River Basin).

Major highways
  State Route 54
  State Route 74
  State Route 85
  State Route 92
  State Route 138
  State Route 279
  State Route 314

Adjacent counties
 Fulton County – north
 Clayton County – east
 Spalding County – south
 Coweta County – west

Demographics

Based on the 2010 census and 2013 estimates, Fayette County has 108,365 people. The racial makeup of the county was 71.7% White; 21.4% Black or African American; 0.4% Native American, 4.3% Asian, 0.1% Native Hawaiian and other Pacific Islander; and 2.0% two or more races. 6.9% of the population was estimated as Hispanic or Latino of any race.

2000 census
As of the census of 2000, there were 91,263 people, 31,524 households, and 25,975 families residing in the county. There were 32,726 housing units at an average density of 166 per square mile (64/km2). The racial makeup of the county was 80.96% White, 12.87% Black or African American, 0.21% Native American, 2.42% Asian, 0.02% Pacific Islander, 0.76% from other races, and 1.25% from two or more races. 2.83% of the population were Hispanic or Latino of any race.

There were 31,524 households, out of which 43.10% had children under the age of 18 living with them, 71.50% were married couples living together, 8.30% had a female householder with no husband present, and 17.60% were non-families. 15.00% of all households were made up of individuals, and 5.50% had someone living alone who was 65 years of age or older. The average household size was 2.88 and the average family size was 3.20.

In the county, the population was spread out, with 29.10% under the age of 18, 6.50% from 18 to 24, 27.70% from 25 to 44, 27.80% from 45 to 64, and 8.90% who were 65 years of age or older. The median age was 38 years. For every 100 females, there were 95.80 males. For every 100 females age 18 and over, there were 92.00 males.

The median income for a household in the county was $71,227, and the median income for a family was $78,853 (these figures had risen to $79,498 and $89,873 respectively as of a 2007 estimate). Males had a median income of $54,738 versus $33,333 for females. The per capita income for the county was $29,464. About 2.00% of families and 2.60% of the population were below the poverty line, including 2.80% of those under age 18 and 4.60% of those age 65 or over.

2010 census
As of the 2010 United States Census, there were 106,567 people, 38,167 households, and 30,288 families residing in the county. The racial makeup of the county was 71.1% white, 20.1% black or African American, 3.9% Asian, 0.3% American Indian, 0.1% Pacific islander, 2.3% from other races, and 2.2% from two or more races. Those of Hispanic or Latino origin made up 6.3% of the population. In terms of European ancestry, 15.0% identified as English, 14.0% as German, 13.0% as Irish, and 8.1% simply as American.

Of the 38,167 households, 39.5% had children under the age of 18 living with them, 65.7% were married couples living together, 10.3% had a female householder with no husband present, 20.6% were non-families, and 18.1% of all households were made up of individuals. The average household size was 2.78 and the average family size was 3.15. The median age was 42.4 years.

The median income for a household in the county was $82,216 and the median income for a family was $92,976. Males had a median income of $68,381 versus $46,140 for females. The per capita income for the county was $35,076. About 3.4% of families and 4.7% of the population were below the poverty line, including 6.1% of those under age 18 and 3.8% of those age 65 or over.

2020 census

As of the 2020 United States census, there were 119,194 people, 41,253 households, and 33,101 families residing in the county.

Education

Fayette County is served by the Fayette County School System. The governing authority for the school system is known as the Fayette County Board of Education, a board of five elected persons. They hire a superintendent to manage daily operations of the schools.

Since a federal court ruling in 2013, resulting from the federal voting rights lawsuit described above, the five board members are each elected from single-member districts. In January 2016 after mediation, the school board voted unanimously to settle the lawsuit they had earlier appealed along with the county. The board accepted single-member districts for election of board members.

High schools
 Fayette County High School
 McIntosh High School
 Sandy Creek High School
 Starr's Mill High School
 Whitewater High School

Alternative schools
 Fayette County Alternative Education Program

Communities 

In 2015, the majority-white city of Fayetteville elected its first African-American mayor, Ed Johnson. Described as a "bridge-builder," Johnson is a retired naval commander and pastor of a black church; he was elected in 2011 as the first black member of the city council.

Cities 
 Fayetteville (county seat)
 Peachtree City (largest city)

Towns 
 Brooks
 Tyrone
 Woolsey

Unincorporated communities 
 Inman
 Starrs Mill

Notable people

 Paris Bennett, singer
 Chris Benoit, WWE wrestler
 Furman Bisher, longtime late sports columnist, Atlanta Journal-Constitution
 Robert H. Brooks, former Chairman and CEO, Hooter's of America Inc.
 Zac Brown, Grammy award-winning singer, Zac Brown Band
 Robert J Burch, children's author
 Kandi Burruss, singer, reality TV star
 Kathy Cox, State School Superintendent
 Creflo Dollar, televangelist
 Mike Duke, former CEO of Wal-Mart Stores Inc.
 Lee Haney, retired professional bodybuilder and Mr. Olympia titleholder
 Evander Holyfield, retired professional boxer
 Tim Hudson, former starting pitcher with the Atlanta Braves and San Francisco Giants
 Calvin Johnson, former NFL receiver for the Detroit Lions, Sandy Creek HS and Georgia Tech alum
 Emmanuel Lewis, actor, Webster
 Carole Marsh, children's author and founder of Gallopade International
 Kelley O'Hara, United States Women's Soccer Player, 2011 FIFA World Cup silver medalist, 2012 Olympic gold medalist, 2015 FIFA World Cup gold medalist
 Paul Orndorff, pro wrestler
 Ferrol Sams, physician, humorist, storyteller, and best-selling novelist
 Reed Sorenson, NASCAR driver
 Christian Taylor, gold medal winner, 2012 Olympic Games (London) men's triple jump
 Gy Waldron, creator and executive producer, The Dukes of Hazzard
 John Waller, contemporary Christian singer
 Gary Anthony Williams, television and film actor

See also

 National Register of Historic Places listings in Fayette County, GA
List of counties in Georgia

References

Other reading
 Charles S. Bullock III and Ronald Keith Gaddie, The Triumph of Voting Rights in the South (University of Oklahoma Press, 2009/2014)
 Carolyn C. Cary, ed., The History of Fayette County, 1821-1971 (Fayetteville, Ga.: Fayette County Historical Society, 1977).
 Fayette County Historical Society, The Fayette County Georgia Heritage Book (Waynesville, N.C.: Walsworth, 2003).

External links
 Fayette County Board of Commissioners
 Fayette County Board of Education
 Fayette County Development Authority (updated demographic information)
 Young Professionals of Fayette County
 Fayette County historical marker
 Georgia State Conference NAACP, et al. v. Fayette County Board of Commissioners, et al. (2016), NAACP Legal Defense Fund

 
1821 establishments in Georgia (U.S. state)
Populated places established in 1821
History of voting rights in the United States
Georgia (U.S. state) counties
Fayette